Qaleh Juq-e Sofla (also Romanized as Qal‘eh Jūq-e Soflá; also known as Qal‘eh Jūq-e Pā'īn) is a village in Sahandabad Rural District, Tekmeh Dash District, Bostanabad County, East Azerbaijan Province, Iran. At the 2006 census, its population was 75, in 17 families.

References 

Populated places in Bostanabad County